Rootless cosmopolitan was a pejorative Soviet epithet which referred mostly to Jewish intellectuals as an accusation of their lack of allegiance to the Soviet Union, especially during the antisemitic campaign of 1948–1953. This campaign had its roots in Joseph Stalin's 1946 attack on writers who were connected with "bourgeois Western influences", culminating in the "exposure" of the non-existent Doctors' Plot in 1953.

Origin 
The expression was coined in the 19th century by Russian literary critic Vissarion Belinsky to describe writers who lacked Russian national character.

Use under Stalin 

According to the journalist Masha Gessen, a concise definition of rootless cosmopolitan appeared in an issue of Voprosy istorii (The Issues of History) in 1949: "The rootless cosmopolitan [...] falsifies and misrepresents the worldwide historical role of the Russian people in the construction of socialist society and the victory over the enemies of humanity, over German fascism in the Great Patriotic War." Gessen states that the term used for "Russian" is an exclusive term that means ethnic Russians only and so they conclude that "any historian who neglected to sing the praises of the heroic ethnic Russians [...] was a likely traitor". According to Cathy S. Gelbin:
From 1946 onwards, then, when Andrei Zhdanov became director of Soviet cultural policy, Soviet rhetoric increasingly highlighted the goal of a pure Soviet culture freed from Western degeneration. This became apparent, for example, in a piece in the Soviet weekly Literaturnaya Gazeta in 1947, which denounced the claimed expressions of rootless cosmopolitanism as inimical to Soviet culture. From 1949 onwards, then, a new series of openly antisemitic purges and executions began across the Soviet Union and its satellite countries, when Jews were charged explicitly with harbouring an international Zionist cosmopolitanist conspiracy.

According to Margarita Levantovskaya:
The campaign against cosmopolitanism of the 1940s and 1950s [...] defined rootless cosmopolitans as citizens who lacked patriotism and disseminated foreign influence within the USSR, including theater critics, Yiddish-speaking poets and doctors. They were accused of disseminating Western European philosophies of aesthetics, pro-American attitudes, Zionism, or inappropriate levels of concern for Jewry and its destruction during World War II. The phrase "rootless cosmopolitan" was synonymous with "persons without identity" and "passportless wanderers" when applied to Jews, thus emphasizing their status as strangers and outsiders.

Post-Stalin 
The term is still considered to be an antisemitic trope.

See also 
 Person of Jewish ethnicity
 Night of the Murdered Poets
 Antisemitism in the Soviet Union

References

Further reading 
 
 
 
 
 

Antisemitism in the Soviet Union
Euphemisms
Jews and Judaism in the Soviet Union
Political slurs for people
Political repression in the Soviet Union
Soviet ethnic policy
Soviet phraseology
Conspiracy theories involving Jews